The Hac Sa Bay Park is an ocean side park located on Coloane, Macau, China. It is named for the black sand beaches (including Hac Sa Beach) in the area.

See also

 List of tourist attractions in Macau

Urban public parks in Macau
Coloane